Michał Rozmys (born 13 March 1995 in Lubsko) is a Polish middle-distance runner. He represented his country in the 800 metres at the 2017 World Championships. In addition, he won a bronze medal in the 1500 metres at the 2017 European U23 Championships and a gold at the 2019 Summer Universiade.

Rozmys received media coverage worldwide when competing in the Athletics at the 2020 Summer Olympics – Men's 1500 metres he lost a shoe but continued to finish his semifinal race with just one shoe on.

International competitions

Personal bests

Outdoor
400 metres – 48.95 (Ostróda 2018)
600 metres – 1:16.81 (Chojnice 2018)
800 metres – 1:45.32 (Berlin 2018)
1000 metres – 2:17.21 (Sopot 2021)
1500 metres – 3:32.67 (Tokyo 2021)
One mile – 3:55.13 (Oslo 2022)
3000 metres – 8:11.90 (Lille 2017)
Indoor
800 metres – 1:47.29 (Karlsruhe 2019)
1000 metres – 2:31.72 (Spała 2012)
1500 metres – 3:36.10 (Toruń 2021)
3000 metres – 7:49.83 (Toruń 2022)

References

1995 births
Living people
Polish male middle-distance runners
World Athletics Championships athletes for Poland
People from Lubsko
Universiade gold medalists in athletics (track and field)
Universiade gold medalists for Poland
Competitors at the 2017 Summer Universiade
Medalists at the 2019 Summer Universiade
Athletes (track and field) at the 2020 Summer Olympics
Olympic athletes of Poland
21st-century Polish people
20th-century Polish people